Ethan Colbey Westbrooks (born November 15, 1990) is an American football defensive end for the Michigan Panthers of the United States Football League (USFL). He played college football at West Texas A&M University and signed with the St. Louis Rams as an undrafted free agent in 2014.

Early years
Westbrooks attended and played football at Franklin High School in Elk Grove, California where he earned All-league and All-conference honors.  He also participated in track and field as he threw the shot put and discus.

College career
Westbrooks began his college career at San Joaquin Delta College where he played defensive end ending his freshman season with 12 sacks. He later transferred to Sacramento City College where he played defensive end and earned All-league honors All-conference accolades and All-state in 2011.

He transferred to West Texas A&M where he was recognized as Lone Star Conference Defensive Lineman of the Year in 2012. Westbrooks had an outstanding first season in a Buffalo uniform as he played in all 15 games with 14 starts on the defensive line. He had 60 total tackles with 29 solo stops and led the team and conference with 28 tackles for loss for 139 yards.  He led the team, the league, and the nation in sacks with a school-record 19.5 sacks for 116 yards.  He had two pass breakups and a team-high 19 quarterback hurries, while forcing three fumbles.

As a senior in 2012 with opponents keying in on him, Westbrooks numbers dropped significantly in 2013 with 43 tackles, 19.5 for losses, and seven sacks. He was selected to the 2014 East–West Shrine Game, and earned Defensive MVP honors during the game with two sacks and two more tackles for loss.

Professional career

St. Louis / Los Angeles Rams
Westbrooks went undrafted in the 2014 NFL Draft. He was signed as an undrafted free agent by the St. Louis Rams. He had a strong training camp and preseason, earning a spot on the 53-member active squad at the start of the 2014 season. During his rookie season in 2014, Westbrooks played 6 games making 5 tackles. In 2015, he played 13 games making 19 tackles with 2 sacks and a forced fumble.

On September 11, 2017, Westbrook signed a one-year contract extension with the Rams.

Oakland Raiders
On July 30, 2019, Westbrooks signed with the Oakland Raiders. He was released on August 31, 2019.

San Francisco 49ers
On February 12, 2020, Westbrooks was signed by the San Francisco 49ers, but was released two days later.

Las Vegas Raiders
On August 11, 2021, Westbrooks signed with the Las Vegas Raiders, but released five days later.

New Orleans Saints
On December 27, 2021, Westbrooks was signed to the New Orleans Saints practice squad.

Pittsburgh Maulers
On March 10, 2022, Westbrooks was drafted by the Pittsburgh Maulers of the United States Football League (USFL). He was transferred to the team's inactive roster on April 22, 2022, due to a quadriceps injury. He was moved back to the active roster on May 6. He was released on May 28, 2022.

Michigan Panthers
Westbrooks was claimed off waivers by the Michigan Panthers on May 28, 2022, and subsequently transferred to the team's inactive roster.

References

External links

Los Angeles Rams bio
 West Texas A&M Buffaloes bio
Pro-Football-Reference

1990 births
Living people
American football defensive ends
Las Vegas Raiders players
Los Angeles Rams players
New Orleans Saints players
Oakland Raiders players
Players of American football from Oakland, California
Sacramento City College alumni
San Francisco 49ers players
San Joaquin Delta College alumni
St. Louis Rams players
West Texas A&M Buffaloes football players
Pittsburgh Maulers (2022) players
Michigan Panthers (2022) players